The Republican Party of Arkansas (RPA), headquartered at 1201 West 6th Street in downtown Little Rock, is the affiliate of the Republican Party in Arkansas. It is currently the dominant party in the state, controlling all four of Arkansas' U.S. House seats, both U.S. Senate seats, all statewide executive offices, including the governorship, and supermajorities in both houses of the state legislature.

The Republican Party of Arkansas was founded on April 2, 1867, by "the leading Union men" of Arkansas. Under Powell Clayton, it played a preeminent role in politics at the height of Reconstruction in the state (1864–1874). The party chairman is Jonelle Fulmer

History 

The Republican Party, also referred to as the GOP (Grand Old Party), is the second oldest currently existing political party in the United States after its older rival, the Democratic Party. Both parties exist in all fifty states. Historically, prior to the late 20th century, the Republican Party was much weaker than the Democratic Party in the former states of the old Confederacy, including Arkansas.

The Arkansas party did not hire its first paid executive director until 1970, when businessman Neal Sox Johnson, then of Nashville, Arkansas, assumed the position in the last year of  Winthrop Rockefeller's second term as governor of Arkansas.
Johnson held the position until early in 1973, when he left Arkansas to take a position with the former Farmers Home Administration in Washington.

Between 2010 and 2014, similar to what took place in neighboring Oklahoma, Arkansas Republicans won all four U.S. House seats, both U.S. Senate seats, all of the statewide offices, and supermajority control of both chambers of the General Assembly.

Associated groups
There are six groups and these groups are: Arkansas Diversity Alliances Coalition, African American Coalition of Arkansas, Arkansas African American Trailblazers, Arkansas Federation of College Republicans, Arkansas Federation of Young Republicans, Arkansas Federation of Republican Women, and the Arkansas Federation of Teenage Republicans. The Tusk Club is another arm of the Arkansas Republican Party.

Republican governors 
As of 2023, there have been a total of eight Republican governors.

Current elected officials
The Arkansas Republican Party controls all of the state's seven statewide offices. Republicans also hold both of the state's U.S. Senate seats and all four of the state's U.S. House seats.

Members of Congress

U.S. Senate
Republicans have controlled both of Arkansas's seats in the U.S. Senate since 2014:

U.S. House of Representatives
Out of the four seats Arkansas is apportioned in the U.S. House of Representatives, all four are held by Republicans:

Statewide offices
Republicans control all seven of the elected statewide constitutional offices:

 Secretary of State: John Thurston
 State Auditor: Dennis Milligan
 State Treasurer: Mark Lowery
 Commissioner of State Lands: Tommy Land

State legislative leaders
 Senate President Pro Tempore: Jimmy Hickey Jr.
 Senate Majority Leader: Bart Hester 
 Speaker of the House: Matthew Shepherd
 Speaker Pro Tempore: Jon Eubanks
 House Majority Leader: Austin McCollum

List of chairmen 
This is a list of chairmen of the Republican Party of Arkansas:

 1932–1955: Osro Cobb
 1955–1962: Ben C. Henley
 1962–1964: William L. Spicer 
 1964–1966: John P. Hammerschmidt 
 1966–1970: Odell Pollard 
 1970–1972: Charles T. Bernard
 1972–1974: Jim Caldwell
 1974–1980: A. Lynn Lowe
 1980: Jeraldine D. Pruden (interim)
 1980–1982: Harlan Holleman
 1982: Bob Cohee (interim)
 1982–1983: Morris S. Arnold
 1983–1984: Bob Leslie
 1984–1985: William Kelly
 1985: Sharon Trusty (interim)
 1985–1986: Len E. Blaylock
 1986–1988: Ed Bethune
 1988–1990: Dr. Ken Coon
 1991–1992: Asa Hutchinson (co-chairman)
 1991–1992: Sheffield Nelson (co-chairman)
 1992–1995: Asa Hutchinson
 1996–2002: Lloyd Vance Stone Jr.
 2002–2003: John P. Hammerschmidt
 2003–2004: Winthrop P. Rockefeller
 2004–2007: Gilbert Baker
 2007–2008: Dennis Milligan
 2008–2020: Doyle Webb
 2020–present: Jonelle Fulmer

See also
 Democratic Party of Arkansas
 Political party strength in Arkansas

References

Notes

Citations

External links

 
 

 
1867 establishments in Arkansas
Non-profit organizations based in Little Rock, Arkansas
Political parties in Arkansas
Political parties established in 1867
Reconstruction Era
Arkansas